Chigozie Udoji (born 16 July 1986), also known by his Bulgarian name Mitko Georgiev, is a Nigerian footballer who plays as a striker and is currently playing for Vihren Sandanski.

Club career
Udoji moved to Bulgaria in 2004 and was initially signed by Vihren Sandanski. In 2007, he was transferred to CSKA Sofia where he stayed until the summer of 2009. The Nigerian then played for Asteras Tripolis in Greece before relocating to Romania in 2011. He scored two goals for Atromitos, both against OFI, before leaving the club. Udoji joined Aris in July 2013. He scored three goals in his first unofficial match, against National Gazoros. He was part of the Belarusian Premier League team Dinamo Minsk's squad between March 2014 and late January 2016, appearing in 70 matches, scoring 21 goals and making 7 assists in all tournaments. On 3 March 2017, he moved to Norwegian club Lillestrøm. Udoji joined Cypriot side Enosis Neon Paralimni in the summer of 2018.

International career
In 2007 Udoji played for Bulgaria U21 in a friendly match against Greece U21. He scored two goals. The result of the match was a 4–1 win for Bulgaria. He was subsequently found to be ineligible and could from then on only represent Nigeria.

Career statistics

Club

Honours
CSKA Sofia
 Bulgarian League (1): 2007–08
 Bulgarian Supercup (1): 2008

Lillestrøm
Norwegian Football Cup (1): 2017

Personal
In July 2006, he received a Bulgarian passport and a Bulgarian name, Mitko Atanasov Georgiev.

References

External links
 
 Profile at football24.bg
 

1986 births
Living people
Sportspeople from Lagos
Nigerian footballers
Bulgarian footballers
Association football midfielders
First Professional Football League (Bulgaria) players
Naturalised citizens of Bulgaria
Nigerian expatriate footballers
Expatriate footballers in Bulgaria
Expatriate footballers in Greece
Expatriate footballers in Romania
Expatriate footballers in Belarus
Expatriate footballers in China
Expatriate footballers in Norway
Expatriate footballers in Cyprus
Nigerian expatriate sportspeople in Bulgaria
Nigerian expatriate sportspeople in Greece
Nigerian expatriate sportspeople in Romania
Super League Greece players
China League One players
OFC Vihren Sandanski players
PFC CSKA Sofia players
Asteras Tripolis F.C. players
FC Astra Giurgiu players
FC Brașov (1936) players
Platanias F.C. players
Atromitos F.C. players
Aris Thessaloniki F.C. players
FC Dinamo Minsk players
Qingdao Hainiu F.C. (1990) players
Lillestrøm SK players
Enosis Neon Paralimni FC players